′Asheq Omar (also spelled ′Ashiq Umar)  is a Syrian village located in Ayn Halaqim Nahiyah in Masyaf District, Hama.  According to the Syria Central Bureau of Statistics (CBS), ′Asheq Omar had a population of 473 in the 2004 census.

References 

Populated places in Masyaf District